Banyo is a northern suburb in the City of Brisbane, Queensland, Australia.

It is a community split between residential and industrial land usage, the latter being attracted by the accessibility of local transport, including the Gateway Motorway.

Geography
Banyo and the neighbouring suburb Nudgee, with which it is intertwined in many respects, are both rich in local history. This history includes the recent preservation of an Aboriginal Bora Ring. The areas of Nudgee and Nudgee Beach border on the Boondall Wetlands, which is protected by the Brisbane City Council.

Banyo has vastly increased the number of its business and industrial parks in recent years due to its close proximity to Brisbane Airport and the nearby Port of Brisbane. Nudgee Road is progressively becoming a commercial hub due to its connection to the Gateway Motorway, with a large service centre and petrol station and with new industrial grounds under construction overlooking the motorway itself.

The Australian Catholic University chose to establish its Brisbane campus on the site of the former Pius XII Seminary. The opening of a Woolworths Supermarket also boosted the Banyo housing market.

A residential estate, 'Couture', has been developed on the site of an old Army depot lying adjacent to the Golden Circle cannery based in next-door Northgate. Another new residential estate, 'Summerlin' has also recently been constructed on a former Hills Hoist manufacturing plant.

The Shorncliffe railway line enters the suburb from the west (Virginia) and exits to the north (Boondall). The suburb is served by Banyo railway station at the intersection of Royal Parade and St Vincents Road.

Banyo's commercial centre (the area surrounding Banyo railway station) has recently been enhanced following a Brisbane City Council Suburban Community Improvement Project (SCIP).

History 
Originally inhabited by the native Turrbal tribe, the area became known as Clapham Junction once the suburb was settled by Europeans in 1849. It was not until 1897 when it officially adopted the name Banyo, an Aboriginal word which means a hill or ridge. The name was chosen by the Secretary for Railways James Dickson, and was also given to the Banyo railway station. The hill that it was named after no longer exists, having been quarried for the construction of Eagle Farm Airport during World War II.

Nudgee State School opened on 28 June 1875 on Nudgee Road on the western side of Nudgee Road, just south of the junction with Tufnell Road on land donated by Isaac Stuckey (present day address approx 936 Nudgee Road). By 1924 frequent flooding of the school building and growth in the local population led to new school buildings being erected at 453 Earnshaw Road. On 31 December 2002 it was closed as part of an amalgamated with Banyo State High School to form Earnshaw State College, which opened in January 2003 from the site of the former high school. "A" Block of the former state school is listed on the Brisbane Heritage Register. The Nudgee State School website was archived.

In June 1884, approximately 600 allotments of "Clapham Junction Estate" were advertised to be auctioned by James R. Dickson & Company, auctioneers. The map advertising the auction states the Estate has magnificent view of the bay, and is located on the Sandgate Line between Toombul and Nudgee Stations.

In January 1888, the "Croydon Estate" made up of approximately 362 allotments was advertised to be auctioned by James R. Dickson & Company, auctioneers. The map advertising the auction states the Estate adjoins "Clapham Junction Estate" and is close to Sandgate Railway Station.

In 1918 local Anglicans purchased a block of land for £240. St Oswald's Anglican Church was dedicated on 17 February 1929 by Archbishop Gerald Sharp. The church hall was built in 1946.

On Saturday 14 March 1925, the Banyo Memorial School of Arts was officially opened by the Queensland Governor, Matthew Nathan. It was at the junction of St Vincents Road and Royal Parade. Inside there was a World War I Honour Board and a photo of the deceased Mrs Emma Purchase who had instigated the movement to construct the School of Arts. Another Honour Board was installed after World War II. By the 1990s the hall was in a dilapidated condition and in May 1988 a public meeting voted to demolish the hall, which took place in October 1988 and the land was sold in 2001. Funds from the sale were used to build a bandstand in Banyo Memorial Park in 2013.

Baptist services commenced in the Banyo School of Arts in March 1925. In October 1928, Arthur Hartley donated a  piece of land to construct a Baptist church. The Banyo Baptist Church was officially opened on Saturday 6 December 1930. The current Baptist Church was built on the same site in 1967.

In January 1927, 102 allotments of the "Northgate Extension Estate" were advertised to be auctioned by Edward S. Crawford & Co., property salesmen, in conjunction with John Coleman, auctioneer. The map advertising the auction states the Estate has salubrious sea breezes with the Sandgate to Brisbane bus service that passes handy to the estate and 68 passenger trains daily.

In September 1927, a plan of the "Purdy Estate" was drawn up by Ernest C. Henzell and W. Carlyle Henzell, Land Agents. The map advertising the land sale shows the land allotments near Banyo Station.

In September 1928, the "Robinson's Paddock Estate" made up of 81 allotments was advertised to be auctioned by Isles, Love, & Co. Limited, auctioneers. The map advertising the auction states the Estate is handy to the station, schools, churches and stores. water and electric light pass the estate, and it is situated within a few miles of the popular sea beaches of Sandgate, Nudgee and Cribb Island.

St Pius' Catholic Primary School opened on 16 March 1947. It was operated by the Sisters of St Joseph of the Sacred Heart.

Banyo State High School opened on 2 February 1954 and closed on 31 December 2002. It was reopened in January 2003 as Earnshaw State College, after merging with Nudgee State School, creating a "P-12" college.

The Banyo Library opened in 1981 with a major refurbishment in 2009.

The median age of the Banyo population was 37 years of age. 72.2% of people living in Banyo were born in Australia, compared to the national average of 66.7%; the next most common countries of birth were New Zealand 5.3%, India 3.1%, England 2.4%, Philippines 2.0%, China 0.9%. 81.8% of people spoke only English at home; the next most popular languages were 1.6% Punjabi, 1.1% Mandarin, 1.0% Hindi, 0.9% Vietnamese.

Heritage listings 
There are numerous heritage listings in Banyo:

 62 Blinzinger Road: Hartley Farmhouse
 368 Earnshaw Road: United States Army General Depot Sentry Box
 425 Earnshaw Road: former Nudgee Methodist Church (also known as Toombul District Uniting Church)
 453 Earnshaw Road: Nudgee State School A Block
 9 Froude Street: St Oswald's Church and Hall
 58 Meredith Street: White Farmhouse
 1058 Nudgee Road: Former Pius XII Seminary: St Paul's Domain (also known as Australian Catholic University)
 Opposite 15 Royal Parade: Banyo railway station
 201 St vincents Road: Dent Residence
 273 St vincents Road: Banyo War Memorial
 302 St vincents Road: Robinson Farmhouse
 334 St vincents Road: Nudgee Telephone Exchange
 348 St vincents Road: St Pius Presbytery (former) (Church of the Holy Trinity Presbytery)
 274 Tufnell Road: Blinzinger Farmhouse

Education
St Pius' Primary School is a Catholic primary (Prep-6) school for boys and girls at Apperley Street. In 2018, the school had an enrolment of 384 students with 30 teachers (24 full-time equivalent) and 15 non-teaching staff (10 full-time equivalent).

Earnshaw State College is a government primary and secondary (Prep-12) school for boys and girls on the corner Earnshaw Road and Tufnell Road. In 2018, the school had an enrolment of 728 students with 68 teachers (64 full-time equivalent) and 39 non-teaching staff (27 full-time equivalent). It includes a special education program.

The McAuley (Brisbane) campus of the Australian Catholic University is at 1100 Nudgee Road. It includes St Paul's Theological College.

Facilities 
Banyo Police station is at 21 Royal Parade.

Amenities 
The Brisbane City Council operates a public library at 284 St Vincents Road.

Shopping centres 
There are two shopping centres in Banyo:

 Banyo Retail Centre, anchored by Woolworths, at 221 Tufnell Road
 Banyo Shopping Centre, at 276 St Vincents Road

Banyo Post Office is in the Banyo Shopping Centre.

Churches 
St Oswald's Anglican Church is at 9 Froude Street. The hall is available for community events and operates the local Meals on Wheels service.

Holy Trinity Catholic Church is at 352 St Vincents Road.

Kenani Community Church is at  425 Earnshaw Road. It is part of the Uniting Church in Australia and supports multi-cultural communities to either worship in their own language or share in worship with others. Kenani is the Rotuman language word for Canaan.

Banyo Presbyterian Church is at 341 St Vincents Road. It is part of the Presbyterian Church of Queensland.

Banyo Baptist Church is at 22 Hartley Street (corner of Musgrave Road).

Sport 
Despite its name, the Virginia Golf Club is located at Elliott Road, Banyo.

Supercars team Triple Eight Race Engineering are based in Banyo.

Transport
Banyo railway station provides access to regular Queensland Rail City network services to Brisbane and Shorncliffe. The 306 bus service operated by Brisbane Transport also goes to the Cultural Centre via Fortitude Valley.

Banyo station has recently undergone an upgrade. The upgrade included restoring the 100-year-old station building, toilet upgrade, new and improved station furniture and signage, fresh painting and station cleaning.

The Australian Catholic University operates a free bus for students that runs from Toombul to the university via Northgate station and another bus between the university and Westfield Chermside.

References

External links

 
 
 

 
Suburbs of the City of Brisbane